Dance Star is a 2010 British dance musical film set in Essex, UK. It was written and directed by Steven M. Smith. The cast includes Bruce Payne, Megan Little Vivien Creegor and Jon-Paul Gates.

Plot
A teenager named Josie has never performed or auditioned for anybody at a professional level. But when her father leaves the family home she decides to enter a local talent competition which reveals her innate ability to dance.

Cast
 Kristina Ballard as Judge Master
 Vivien Creegor as Helen
 Jon-Paul Gates as Mr. Draper
 Jasmine Harris as Sara
 Rebecca Hedges as Morgan
 Megan Little as Josie
 Laura Macallister as Sophia
 Bruce Payne as Harry
 John Scott as Judge #2
 Chantelle Severin as Trish
 Steven M. Smith as Colin
 Tabitha Smythe as Keeta
 Damion Spencer as Street Dancer #1

References

External links
 
 

2010 films
British dance films
2010s English-language films
2010s British films